Acianthera atroglossa is a species of orchid plant native to  Brazil.

References 

atroglossa
Flora of Brazil